The Brazil Open Series is a professional tennis tournament played on outdoor hard courts. It is currently part of the ATP Challenger Tour. It is held annually in Curitiba, Brazil, since 2010.

Past finals

Singles

Doubles

External links
ITF Search

ATP Challenger Tour
Hard court tennis tournaments
Tennis tournaments in Brazil